The first season of the American crime thriller television series The Blacklist premiered on NBC on September 23, 2013. The season was produced by Davis Entertainment, Universal Television, and Sony Pictures Television, and the executive producers are Jon Bokenkamp, John Davis, John Eisendrath, John Fox, and Joe Carnahan.

Premise 
The first season introduces Raymond Reddington (James Spader), Elizabeth "Liz" Keen (Megan Boone) and the members of the Task Force, a multiagency law enforcement working group dedicated to hunting down Reddington.  Reddington surrenders to the FBI and offers to identify and help capture the criminals he has worked with, whom he calls "The Blacklist", but only if he is allowed to work with Liz Keen, a rookie profiler at the FBI. He refuses to explain why Liz must be involved. The Reddington Task Force, led by Assistant Director Harold Cooper (Harry Lennix), becomes the lead law enforcement agency responsible for capturing or killing the members of the Blacklist at Reddington's behest (usually to Red's benefit), which causes conflicts particularly for Special Agent Donald Ressler (Diego Klattenhoff), who was originally tasked with capturing Reddington. This is the only season for Meera Malik (Parminder Nagra), a CIA officer and member of the Task Force, who is killed in the season finale. The season also introduces series antagonist Milos Kirchoff (Peter Stormare), AKA Berlin, a former Russian KGB officer with a longstanding hatred of Reddington. A major subplot for the season is Elizabeth Keen's discovery that her husband Tom Keen (Ryan Eggold), a schoolteacher to all appearances, is actually a covert operative with an unknown agenda and Liz's efforts to discover who he actually is and who sent him.  A second subplot involves the Cabal, a shadowy multinational group that holds positions of influence in government and business, and their interest in Reddington's activities. The Cabal is usually represented by Alan Fitch (Alan Alda), the Deputy Director of National Intelligence, who tries to maintain a civil relationship with Reddington despite the Cabal's misgivings while trying to determine what Reddington actually knows.

Cast

Main cast
 James Spader as Raymond "Red" Reddington
 Megan Boone as FBI Special Agent Elizabeth Keen
 Diego Klattenhoff as FBI Special Agent Donald Ressler
 Ryan Eggold as Tom Keen
 Harry Lennix as FBI Assistant Director Harold Cooper
 Parminder Nagra as Meera Malik

Recurring cast
 Amir Arison as Aram Mojtabai, a quirky and skilled technician who regularly assists the FBI.
 Charles Baker as Grey (Newton Phillips), Red's aide.
 Hisham Tawfiq as Dembe Zuma, Red's trusted bodyguard.
 Deborah S. Craig as Luli Zheng, Red's other bodyguard who usually handles finances.
 Jane Alexander as Diane Fowler, the head of the FBI's counterterrorism unit.
 Alan Alda as Alan Fitch, a member of a mysterious government organization that has come in contact with Red.
 Susan Blommaert as Mr. Kaplan, who is actually a woman and Red's personal "cleaner".
 Graeme Malcolm as "The Man with the Apple", an unnamed man in charge of the surveillance of the Keen household.
 Rachel Brosnahan as Lucy Brooks (alias Jolene Parker), a woman working for Berlin who weaves her way into the Keens' life.
 Lance Reddick as The Cowboy, a bounty hunter hired by Red to track down Jolene Parker/Lucy Brooks.
 Emily Tremaine as Audrey Bidwell, Ressler's former fiancée.
 Peter Stormare as Milos Kirchoff, AKA "Berlin", a former member of the KGB and an escaped convict.
 Dikran Tulaine as Max, a skilled bomb maker and longtime acquaintance of Red's

Episodes

Reception
The first season of The Blacklist received strong reviews from television critics. The Blacklist has a Metacritic score of 74 out of 100 based on reviews from 31 critics. The review aggregator website Rotten Tomatoes reports an 85% approval rating based on 52 reviews, with an average score of 7.18/10. The consensus reads: "James Spader is riveting as a criminal-turned-informant, and his presence goes a long way toward making this twisty but occasionally implausible crime procedural compelling". 

David Wiegand of the San Francisco Chronicle said about the pilot: "You think you know this situation and how it will turn out, but there are surprising, yet entirely credible, twists throughout Monday's episode". Robert Bianco of USA Today said: "The Blacklist is a solid weekly crime show built around a genuine TV star. That's the kind of series the networks have to be able to pull off to survive. And with Spader in command, odds are NBC will". Tim Goodman of The Hollywood Reporter praised both Spader's performance and the procedural elements of the show: "There's an overarching element to the premise as well that makes it intriguing without making it overly complicated".

Ratings

Accolades

References

External links
 
 

2013 American television seasons
2014 American television seasons
1